P&W may refer to:
 Portland and Western Railroad
 Philadelphia and Western Railroad
 Providence and Worcester Railroad
 Pratt & Whitney - an aircraft engine manufacturer
 Pratt & Whitney Measurement Systems - a maker of metrological equipment
 Passion and Warfare - an album by Steve Vai